The 2018 season was Barcelona Sporting Club's 93rd in existence and the club's 60th consecutive season in the top flight of Ecuadorian football.

Competitions

Overview

Serie A

First stage

Standings

Results summary

Results by round

Matches

Second stage

Standings

Results summary

Results by round

Matches

Aggregate table

Copa Sudamericana

First stage 

 General Díaz won 2–1 on aggregate and advanced to the second stage.

Notes 

Barcelona S.C. seasons
Barcelona Sporting Club